Carter Isaak Young (born January 24, 2001) is an American professional baseball shortstop in the Baltimore Orioles organization.

Amateur career
Young began playing baseball as a child and began switch hitting at age ten after former MLB player Jay Gainer suggested it to him. He attended Selah High School in Selah, Washington. As a freshman in 2016, he helped Selah win their first ever state championship. In 2018, his junior year, he batted .412 with four home runs and 26 RBIs and was named the Washington Gatorade Baseball Player of the Year. That summer, he played in the Under Armour All-America Baseball Game at Wrigley Field. As a senior in 2019, he helped lead Selah to their second state championship in four years. During his high school career, he played for both the USA Baseball 15U National Team that won a bronze medal as well as for the 18U National Team.

Young went unselected in the 2019 Major League Baseball draft and enrolled at Vanderbilt University to play college baseball. As a freshman in 2020, he started all 18 games in which he batted .328 with 12 RBIs before the season was cancelled due to the COVID-19 pandemic. He played for the Yakima Valley Pippins of the West Coast League that summer. In 2021, his sophomore year, he was forced to miss time due to a dislocated shoulder, but still started 61 games in which he slashed .252/.341/.559 with 16 home runs and 51 RBIs. He had the game-winning RBI in Game 2 of the Nashville Super Regional which ultimately allowed the Commodores to advance to the 2021 College World Series where they lost the series 2-1 to Mississippi State University. His 84 strikeouts over 238 at-bats led NCAA Division 1. He underwent shoulder surgery shortly after the season's end. Young opened the 2022 season as a top prospect for the upcoming draft, but his stock fell after he finished the year batting .207 with seven home runs and 26 RBIs over 56 games, losing his starting spot during the season. He entered the transfer portal after the season. He later announced he would be transferring at Louisiana State University (LSU).

Professional career
Young was selected by the Baltimore Orioles in the 17th round of the 2022 Major League Baseball draft. He signed with the team for $1.32 million.

Young made his professional debut with the Florida Complex League Orioles and was later promoted to the Delmarva Shorebirds. Over 18 games between both teams, he batted .253 with one home run and eight RBIs.

References

External links
Vanderbilt Commodores bio

2001 births
Living people
Baseball players from Washington (state)
Baseball shortstops
Vanderbilt Commodores baseball players
Florida Complex League Orioles players
Delmarva Shorebirds players